Dakoda Armstrong (born July 16, 1991) is an American professional stock car racing driver. He last competed part-time in the NASCAR Xfinity Series, driving the No. 28 Toyota Camry for JGL Racing.

Early career

Armstrong started his racing career racing go-karts at the age of six, winning the 1998 World Karting Association championship in his first year in racing. At age 13, he became the youngest driver to win a USAC national championship when he won the 2004 USAC Mel Kenyon Midget Series. He has won over 200 races while competing in Go-Karts, Quarter Midgets, Bandoleros, Micro/Mini Sprints, Kenyon Midgets, 410 Non-Wing Sprint Cars, and Midgets.

From 2007 to 2010, Armstrong entered select races of the USAC Silver Crown Series, USAC National Sprint Car Championship and USAC National Midget Series.

ARCA Racing Series
Armstrong signed a driver development deal with Penske Racing. As part of the deal, he would drive for Cunningham Motorsports in the ARCA Racing Series for seven races in 2009. He posted a best finish of 3rd along with two other top ten finishes and a 26th-place finish in the standings.

Armstrong returned to Cunningham Motorsports to drive the No. 22 Dodge full-time in 2010. He got his first win in just his 12th start at Talladega Superspeedway. He followed that with another win at Salem Speedway, finishing the season 7th in the standings with two wins, five top fives, 12 top tens, and one pole.

In 2011, Armstrong cut back on his ARCA schedule as he began focusing on his jump to NASCAR. He would run six races, posting one win at Winchester Speedway, two top fives, four top tens, and a 25th-place finish in the standings.

NASCAR

Camping World Truck Series
In 2011, Armstrong signed on with ThorSport Racing and ran 7 races with the team with crew chief Dan Stillman. He made his Camping World Truck Series debut July 17 at Iowa Speedway, finishing 21st. He posted his first top ten October 1 at Kentucky Speedway. Armstrong attempted to run full-time with ThorSport with sponsorship from EverFi in the Truck Series in 2012. He was released from the team before the race at Iowa Speedway in September due to poor performance.

In February 2013 it was announced that Armstrong would be driving for Turn One Racing for the full Truck Series season, and that he would also be running five races in the Nationwide Series for Richard Childress Racing in the No. 33 and No. 21 cars. He ran the No. 19 for TriStar Motorsports at Homestead-Miami. WinField sponsored all his races.

Xfinity Series

On December 4, 2013, it was announced that Armstrong had been signed by Richard Petty Motorsports to compete full-time in the 2014 NASCAR Nationwide Series, driving the No. 43 Ford Mustang. At Daytona, Armstrong had his first career pole for the Subway Firecracker 250 at Daytona after qualifying was cancelled due to a rainshower. He would finish 13th in the points standings in 2014.

He returned to Richard Petty Motorsports in 2015, with new chief Frank Kerr. He finished with a career best of 6th-place at Daytona after avoiding 2 Big Ones. On November 23, it was announced that he and RPM had parted ways due to poor performance.

Armstrong joined JGL Racing in 2016, driving the No. 28 Toyota Camry. He would then return to JGL Racing in 2017. This 2017 season, he scored two top-five finishes: At Iowa Speedway, on June 24, for the race of 2017 American Ethanol E15 250, he finished 5th place, but on 4 July weekend on July 1 (was supposed to be June 30, but postponed because of persistent rain) for the race of 2017 Coca-Cola Firecracker 250, he scored a career-best of 3rd place. However, Armstrong was released by the team on September 25 for a lack of sponsorship. Later in the season, Armstrong was seen in the JGL pit area, though he did not clarify if he had any role with the organization.

Later career

In 2018, Armstrong finished 12th at the ARCA/CRA Super Series's Redbud 400 stock car race at Anderson Speedway.

In 2021, he entered two USAC Sprints non-points races at the Indianapolis Raceway Park, finishing 5th at the Thursday Night Thunder Homecoming and 10th at the Hoosier Classic.

In 2022, Armstrong finished second at Anderson's Little 500 sprint car race, and was runner-up at the Indiana-based 500 Sprint Car Tour. He also entered four USAC Midgets non-points races at the Indianapolis Raceway Park, with a best result of third at the Carb Night Classic.

Personal life
Beyond the racetrack, Armstrong's Indiana family corn and grain farming operation produces 1.9 million gallons of ethanol fuel per year for various energy programs. While growing up on the farm, he worked on his own racecars in the facilities on his family's property. Aside from racing, Armstrong enjoys getting back to his roots and attends open wheel events whenever he can, especially if he can be at the track to mentor his younger siblings when they're racing. His hobbies also include working out, racing his friends in iRacing and watching football. On February 5, 2017, Armstrong married Karlee Hensley.

Dakoda's younger cousin Caleb (born 1992) and younger brother Dalton (born 1994), are both racing drivers as well. Caleb was a developmental driver for Venturini Motorsports like his cousin, competing in a few ARCA races for them in 2012 and 2013. Dalton has competed in the CARS Tour and marquee late model events such as the Winchester 400.

Motorsports career results

NASCAR
(key) (Bold – Pole position awarded by qualifying time. Italics – Pole position earned by points standings or practice time. * – Most laps led.)

Xfinity Series

 Season still in progress 
 Ineligible for series points

Camping World Truck Series

Camping World East Series

ARCA Racing Series
(key) (Bold – Pole position awarded by qualifying time. Italics – Pole position earned by points standings or practice time. * – Most laps led.)

References

External links

 
 

Living people
1991 births
People from New Castle, Indiana
Racing drivers from Indiana
NASCAR drivers
ARCA Menards Series drivers
CARS Tour drivers
World Karting Association drivers
Richard Childress Racing drivers
Joe Gibbs Racing drivers
USAC Silver Crown Series drivers